Richard Cecil Cook (2 March 1902 – 29 July 1977), was an Australian judge and a member of the Industrial Commission of New South Wales.

Early life
Always known by his second given name, Cecil Cook was born in Marrickville, New South Wales, one of nine children of Sir Joseph Cook, a politician and Prime Minister of Australia from 1913 to 1914, and Dame Mary Cook. He attended Newington College (1912–1920) and the University of Sydney, where he graduated with a LL.B. in 1924.

Legal career
After graduating Cook worked as a solicitor until 1928 and then read for the Bar. He was a barrister-at-law until 1954.

Judicial career
Cook was appointed as an additional member Industrial Commission of New South Wales in 1954 and as a judge of the commission on 13 May 1955. He was a judge until his retirement on 1 March 1972.

Wool trade report
In the 1950s, Cook was appointed by the Attorney General under the monopolies act to inquire into the wool trade.

References

1902 births
1977 deaths
20th-century Australian judges
People educated at Newington College
University of Sydney alumni
Children of prime ministers of Australia